Valdes Pasolini (born 3 June 1962) is a retired Sammarinese footballer who played for Cosmos and the San Marino national football team, from whom he played fourteen times between 1990 and 1996, scoring once against Romania. It was the very first goal scored by the San Marino team in an official game.

References 

1962 births
Living people
Sammarinese footballers
San Marino international footballers
Association football forwards